Blairsville is an census designated place in Williamson County, Illinois, United States.

Demographics

References

Unincorporated communities in Williamson County, Illinois
Unincorporated communities in Illinois